The Victoria Memorial Hospital is a health facility in Salop Road, Welshpool, Powys, Wales. It is managed by the Powys Teaching Health Board.

History
The facility has its origins in the Victoria Nursing Institute, the site for which was a gift from the Misses Howell of Rhiewport. It was designed by Frank Shayler, built by Evan Davies and opened in November 1902. It joined the National Health Service as the Victoria Memorial Hospital in 1948 and was substantially rebuilt in 2004. A new 12-bed renal unit opened at the hospital in January 2013.

References

Hospitals in Powys
Hospitals established in 1902
1902 establishments in Wales
Hospital buildings completed in 1902
NHS hospitals in Wales
Powys Teaching Health Board